Dennis Morgan (June 26, 1952 – October 25, 2015) was an American football running back in the National Football League (NFL) for the Dallas Cowboys and the Philadelphia Eagles. He played college football at Western Illinois University.

Early years
Morgan, grew up in White Plains, New York and attended White Plains Senior High School. He was a part of the 1969 undefeated football team.

He also lettered in track and baseball. He set the high school national record for the indoor 40-yard dash at 4.3 seconds.

College career
Morgan attended Bradley University, where he was named the starter at running back as a freshman. The next year, he transferred to Western Illinois University after Bradley dropped its football program. He played running back and returned kickoffs for three seasons for Western Illinois.

As a junior, he averaged more than 30 yards per kickoff return. As a senior, he averaged almost 20 yards per punt return. He finished his college career with 1,254 rushing yards and a 4.7-yard average per carry. He received honorable-mention NAIA All-American honors in 1972.

Professional career

Dallas Cowboys
Morgan was selected by the Dallas Cowboys in the tenth round (255th overall) of the 1974 NFL Draft. Known as "Strawberry" due to his red hair, he started off playing on special teams.

As a rookie, he tied the longest punt return in NFL history with a 98-yard touchdown (also a franchise record) against the St. Louis Cardinals. That season, he finished third in the NFL in punt return average with 15.1 yards and led the team in both punt return yards (287) and kickoff return yards (823).

Morgan was waived on August 4, 1975.

Philadelphia Eagles
On August 6, 1975, Morgan was claimed off waivers by the Philadelphia Eagles. He played in four games, registering 170 yards (24.3 average) on kickoff returns and 60 yards (7.5 average) on punt returns. He was released on October 17.

Personal life
Morgan served in the United States Army after football. He died on October 25, 2015, after suffering a heart attack while attending the New York Giants vs. Dallas Cowboys game at MetLife Stadium.

References

1952 births
2015 deaths
People from White Plains, New York
Players of American football from New York (state)
American football running backs
American football return specialists
Western Illinois Leathernecks football players
Dallas Cowboys players
Philadelphia Eagles players
United States Army soldiers
African-American United States Army personnel
White Plains High School alumni
20th-century African-American people
21st-century African-American people